Susan Lynne Bayh  (November 28, 1959 – February 5, 2021) was an American attorney and First Lady of Indiana from 1989 until 1997. She was married to Evan Bayh, a Democratic Indiana politician, who served as the state's governor (1989–1997) and United States Senator (1999–2011).

A newspaper in Indiana described her as being engaged in a profession it termed "professional board member" or "professional director".

Career
Bayh began her careers in law and business as a litigator for the Los Angeles law firms of Gibson, Dunn & Crutcher, and later for the Indiana firm of Barnes & Thornburg. In 1989, she joined the pharmaceutical division at the Indianapolis-based Eli Lilly and Company, managing the company's handling of federal regulatory issues. In 1994, she left the employ of Eli Lilly and taught at Butler University's College of Business Administration, holding the title of distinguished visiting professor.

An Indiana newspaper listed eight corporations of which Bayh was a director, as of 2006. Bayh began serving on corporate boards in 1994 and thereafter served on the boards of 14 corporations, including the insurance, pharmaceutical, and food processing industries.

Personal life
Bayh earned her Bachelor of Arts degree from the University of California, Berkeley. She was a past Miss Southern California and a member of Alpha Phi. She earned her Juris Doctor degree from the University of Southern California Law School in 1984.

Bayh and her husband had twin sons, Birch Evans IV (Beau) and Nicholas, born in 1995.

In May 2018, Bayh underwent brain surgery to remove a malignant glioblastoma tumor. She died in McLean, Virginia, on February 5, 2021, at the age of 61.

References

External links

Susan B. Bayh, J.D. at Forbes
Collected news and commentary at The Journal Gazette (Fort Wayne, Indiana)

1959 births
2021 deaths
First Ladies and Gentlemen of Indiana
20th-century American businesspeople
20th-century American businesswomen
20th-century American lawyers
20th-century American women lawyers
American corporate directors
American women business executives
Bayh family
Businesspeople from Indiana
Butler University faculty
Corporate lawyers
Deaths from brain cancer in the United States
Deaths from glioblastoma
Eli Lilly and Company people
Evan Bayh
Indiana lawyers
Lawyers from Los Angeles
People associated with Gibson Dunn
People from Indianapolis
People from Los Angeles County, California
USC Gould School of Law alumni
University of California, Berkeley alumni